Rich Men's Sons is a 1927 American silent drama film directed by Ralph Graves and starring Graves, Shirley Mason and Robert Cain.

Cast
 Ralph Graves as Arnold Treadway 
 Shirley Mason as Carla Gordon 
 Robert Cain as Niles McCray 
 Frances Raymond as Mrs. Treadway 
 George Fawcett as Samuel Treadway 
 Johnny Fox as The Office Boy 
Scott Seaton as John Gordon

References

Bibliography
 Langman, Larry. American Film Cycles: The Silent Era. Greenwood Publishing, 1998.

External links
 

1927 films
1927 drama films
1920s English-language films
American silent feature films
Silent American drama films
Films directed by Ralph Graves
American black-and-white films
Columbia Pictures films
1920s American films